Parkland Estates is a neighborhood within the city limits of Tampa, Florida. As of the 2000 census, the neighborhood had a population of 1,040. The ZIP Code serving the neighborhood is 33609.

Geography
Parkland Estates boundaries are Swann Avenue to the north, Morrison Avenue to the south, Lincoln Avenue to the west, and Howard Avenue to the east. See map

Demographics
Source: Hillsborough County Atlas

As of the census of 2000, there were 1,040 people and 480 households residing in the neighborhood. The population density was 4,691/mi2. The racial makeup of the neighborhood was 89% White, 1% African American, 0% Native American,  4% Asian, 4% from other races, and 2% from two or more races. Hispanic or Latino of any race were 6% of the population.

There were 328 households, out of which 24% had children under the age of 18 living with them, 52% were married couples living together, 1% had a female householder with no husband present, and 8% were non-families. 38% of all households were made up of individuals.

In the neighborhood the population was spread out, with 22% under the age of 18, 13% from 18 to 34, 29% from 35 to 49, 22% from 50 to 64, and 15% who were 65 years of age or older. For every 100 females, there were 105.5 males.

The per capita income for the neighborhood was $58,270. About 2% of the population were below the poverty line, none of those under age 18.

History

Parkland Estates was developed by Allen J. Simms. A Street in the community bears his name.

See also
Neighborhoods in Tampa, Florida

References

External links
Parkland Estates Civic Association

Neighborhoods in Tampa, Florida